Edmund Koller (23 August 1930 – 9 June 1998) was a West German bobsledder who competed in the mid-1950s. He won a bronze medal in the four-man event at the 1955 FIBT World Championships in St. Moritz. Koller also finished eighth in the four-man event at the 1956 Winter Olympics in Cortina d'Ampezzo.

References

1930 births
1998 deaths
German male bobsledders
Bobsledders at the 1956 Winter Olympics
Olympic bobsledders of the United Team of Germany